The K&P Trail is a recreational trail that runs along the old Kingston and Pembroke Railway (K&P) bed in Ontario, Canada.

The trail currently consists of several unconnected sections between Kingston and Renfrew:
This section of the trail primarily parallels Highway 38 and runs through rural Kingston, South Frontenac Township and  Central Frontenac Township. The railbed is owned by the City of Kingston and the County of Frontenac. The southern part of this section is primarily though farmland, with wooded areas dominating further north. Communities on the route include Harrowsmith and Verona. Parts of the trail are shared with the Rideau Trail and the Cataraqui Trail. Frontenac County is working to develop the trail up to Sharbot Lake.
 The middle section of the trail runs from Wilbur to Barryvale. This section runs through Lanark Highlands and Greater Madawaska.
 The northern section of the trail runs from Calabogie to Renfrew in Renfrew County.

History 
The K&P railway was abandoned by its owner, the Canadian Pacific Railway, between 1962 and 1986, and ran from Kingston to Renfrew.

See also
 List of trails in Canada

References

External links
 City of Kingston K&P Trail page
 Frontenac Trails
 K&P Trail Group

Rail trails in Ontario
Transport in Kingston, Ontario
Transport in Frontenac County
Transport in Renfrew County
Rail transport in Kingston, Ontario
Rail transport in Frontenac County
Rail transport in Renfrew County